Kulasekharapatnam Spaceport is an under-development spaceport in India. It is being built as ISRO's second spaceport.

The spaceport is being constructed over 2,350 acres. As of July 2022, the acquisition of around 1950 acres (nearly 83%) of land has been completed.

Location 
The spaceport is located at Kulasekharapatnam in the Indian state of Tamil Nadu.

Background 
ISRO's Sriharikota Spaceport is ideal for launching heavy rockets, but poses a major threat during the launch of smaller rockets. Sriharikota presents a threat when rockets are launched in polar orbit (circling the Earth above the poles). The island nation of Sri Lanka is in the path of a rocket traveling to the South Pole from the Sriharikota spaceport. Given the huge risk of flying over a country, India's rockets are programmed to perform a maneuver to avoid Sri Lanka's landmass. So, instead of flying in a straight line, the rocket follows a curved path. To perform this maneuver, the rocket has to burn a reasonable amount of fuel. While big  rockets can perform this maneuver without much impact on the rocket's payload carrying capacity, but smaller rockets such as the SSLV consume a lot of fuel. Fuel consumption to follow a curved trajectory means the rocket's payload capacity is reduced. To avoid this problem, ISRO has undertaken the construction of the Kulasekharapatnam Spaceport, from which small rockets can be launched in a straight line without the risk of crossing Sri Lanka's landmass and save fuel.

Facilities 
This port will mainly be used by ISRO for launching small payloads.

References 

Spaceports
Rocket launch sites in India
Space programme of India
Indian Space Research Organisation facilities
Buildings and structures in Kanyakumari district